Sharonne is the stage name of Cristóbal Garrido (born June 1, 1976). Sharonne is a Spanish drag queen, actress, and singer. She was the winner of season 2 of Drag Race España.

Artistic career 
Cristóbal Garrido started his artistic career at a very young age in the world of amateur theater. He began studying management, but changed course to focus on performance. He studied acting at Escuela TRAM Expressió and dance at Escuela de CO&CO, both in Barcelona. 

Garrido also has another alter ego, DJ Lucy, a character he played as the Master of Ceremonies during The Hole Zero tour.

In Sharonne's work as a singer, she forms part of the duo Shimai, which popularized a version of "Estoy bailando" ("I'm Dancing") by Hermanas Goggi. In 2001, she tried to participate in Eurovision representing Spain as a member of Trans-X, but only made it to twelfth place in the RTVE pre-selection.

As an actress, Garrido participated in the short film Puta de oros (Whore of gold) in the year 2000, and in the Catalonian series El cor de la ciutat (The Heart of the City), in which she played Velvet, a transsexual who appeared throughout one of the seasons.

In 2017, working as Garrido and not one of her personas, she participated in the television competition show Tu cara no me suena todavía (Your face no longer calls to me) on Antena 3, impersonating Olga Guillot and performing her song "Soy lo prohibido." She won the first round, which earned her a place in the final, where she ultimately took third place. 

The next year, she participated in La Marató de TV3 (The TV3 Marathon) where she paid tribute to people who had died from cancer, singing the song "(You Make Me Feel Like) A Natural Woman" by Aretha Franklin. Additionally, together with Beni Sánchez, Sharonne hosted the 2018 Gala de Reines del Carnaval in Vinaròs. 

In 2022, Sharonne was announced as one of the participants in the second season of Drag Race España, the Spanish version of the Drag Race franchise. In one of the show's most well-known challenges, Snatch Game, she impersonated Verónica Forqué, which won her the episode. After a season of being consistently among the top performers and without any negative placements from the judges, she finally attained victory and was crowned as Spain's Drag Superstar, succeeding season one winner Carmen Farala. After her win, it was announced that she would participate in the Gran Hotel de las Reinas tour.

Sharonne also signed on with the platform AtresPlayer to star in Reinas al Rescate (Queens to the Rescue) with Supremme de Luxe, Pupi Poisson, and Estrella Xtravaganza. The queens will travel to rural Spanish towns in search of LGBT history.

In October 2022, it was announced that Sharonne would participate in Benidorm Fest 2023, the contest that selects a Spanish representative to send to the Eurovision Song Contest with her song "Aire" (Air). She scored 87 points in the first semifinal, but did not manage to continue to the next phase of the contest.

Discography

Singles 

 2019 – Hi!
 2022 – Llévame al cielo (Remix) (with Supremme de Luxe, Estrella Xtravaganza, Marina, and Venedita Von Däsh)
 2022 – Aire

Filmography

Film 

 Puta de oros (short film, 2000)

Television

Web series

References

1976 births
Living people
Benidorm Fest contestants
Drag Race España winners
Spanish drag queens